FC Salyut Belgorod is a Russian association football club based in Belgorod. They play in the FNL 2.

History
The club was founded in 1960 and has been known as:
 Tsementnik (Cement Worker) (1960–63)
 Spartak (1964–69)
 Salyut (Salute) (1970–91, 1993–95, 2010–14, 2018–)
 Energomash (Power Machine Building) (1991–92)
 Salyut-YUKOS (1996–99)
 Salyut-Energiya (2000–09)

Tsementnik played in the Class B in 1960 and 1961. After the team became the part of Spartak sports society, they re-entered the competition in 1964. In 1968 Spartak finished third in the finals of Class B and were promoted to the Class A, Group 2. After the reorganization of the leagues in 1971 Salyut played in the Soviet Second League until 1989. In 1990 and 1991 the team played in the Soviet Second League B.

In 1992 Energomash entered the newly formed Russian First League and were relegated. In 1993, the team finished first in Zone 2 of the Russian Second League but were not promoted. In 1995 Salyut were relegated from the Second League, but returned immediately after topping their zone in the Third League. Salyut-YUKOS were relegated again after another three years in the Second Division (1997–1999), this time to the amateur league (KFK). In 2000, they won the promotion back to the professional football. In 2001–2005 Salyut-Energia were among the leaders of the Second Division, finishing no lower than fifth in their zone. In 2005, the team finished first and were promoted to the First Division. The team finished 17th in 2010 and relegated to Second Division.

During winter break 2013–2014, Salyut experienced huge financial difficulties. Almost all contracts with first-team players were terminated by mutual consent. As a result, on 14 February 2014 club officially withdrew from competition in Russian National Football League.

Belgorod was represented professionally by FC Energomash Belgorod from 2015 to 2018.

Before the 2018–19 season, Salyut was revived and entered the third-tier Russian Professional Football League.

Current squad
As of 21 February 2023, according to the Second League website.

League results

External links
Fans website

References

Football clubs in Russia
Sport in Belgorod
Association football clubs established in 1960
1960 establishments in Russia